The Top of the Hill bar shooting, or Annie's Bar massacre, was a mass shooting in Derry, Northern Ireland on 20 December 1972, during the Troubles. Five civilians were killed when members of the Ulster Defence Association (UDA), a loyalist paramilitary group, opened fire on the customers in a pub frequented by Catholics.

Background
The UDA was formed in September 1971, during one of the most violent phases of the Troubles, after internment was introduced, when several loyalist vigilante "defence" groups combined. They began using the cover name "Ulster Freedom Fighters" (UFF) to claim responsibility for paramilitary attacks, allowing the UDA to remain legal. The UDA carried out its first killing on 20 April 1972, shooting a Catholic taxi driver in Ardoyne, Belfast. In October, the group was responsible for the deaths of two children when they detonated a car bomb outside a Catholic pub in Sailortown, Belfast.

On 20 December 1972, (the same day as the bar shooting) Ulster Defence Regiment (UDR) soldier George Hamilton was killed by a Provisional IRA sniper a few miles outside Derry.

Shooting
That night, the Top of the Hill Bar (or Annie's Bar) on the Strabane Old Road was packed with customers watching a football match. The pub was in a small Catholic neighbourhood in the mainly-Protestant Waterside of Derry city. At about 10:30 pm two UDA gunmen burst into the pub, one armed with a Sterling submachine gun and the other a pistol. They indiscriminately sprayed the pub with gunfire, killing five men: Catholic civilians Charlie McCafferty (31), Frank McCarron (58), Barney Kelly (26) and Michael McGinley (37), and Protestant civilian Charles Moore (31). 

The shooting was seen as a sectarian revenge attack for the killing of Hamilton. The massacre shocked the city, which until then had largely escaped the serious sectarian conflict experienced in Belfast. Although no group claimed responsibility, it is believed to have been carried out by the UDA. At the time it was the UDA's deadliest attack. They did not carry out another attack of this size until 1992, when they killed five civilians and wounded nine in the Sean Graham bookmakers' shooting in Belfast.

Nobody was ever charged in connection with the massacre, although in recent years relatives of those killed have been calling for a fresh investigation.

See also
 Timeline of Ulster Defence Association actions
 Greysteel massacre

References

1972 in Northern Ireland
Deaths by firearm in Northern Ireland
Massacres in Northern Ireland
Ulster Defence Association actions
Mass murder in 1972
1972 murders in the United Kingdom
December 1972 events in the United Kingdom
The Troubles in Derry (city)
1970s mass shootings in the United Kingdom 
Mass shootings in Northern Ireland
Mass murder in County Londonderry
Attacks on bars in Northern Ireland
Massacres in 1972
Terrorist incidents in the United Kingdom in 1972
1972 crimes in Ireland
1970s murders in Northern Ireland